Vitória Futebol Clube, commonly referred to as Vitória, is a Brazilian professional club based in Vitória, Espírito Santo founded on 1 October 1912. It competes in the Campeonato Capixaba, the top flight of the Espírito Santo state football league.

Vitória is the second-best ranked team from Espírito Santo in CBF's national club ranking, behind Rio Branco.

History
On October 1, 1912, Vitória Futebol Clube was founded as Foot-ball Club Victoria by João Pereira Neto, João Nascimento, Armando Ayres, Graciano dos Santos Neves, Edgar dos Santos Neves, Névio Costa, Edgard O’Reilly de Souza, Pedro O’Reilly de Souza, Constâncio Espíndula and Taciano Espíndula, among others, at a two-storey house located in São Francisco street. João Pereira Neto was elected as the club's first president.

In 1932, Vitória won its first state championship.

In 1977, the club competed in the Campeonato Brasileiro Série A for the first time, finishing in the 40th place, ahead of clubs like Atlético Paranaense and Coritiba.

In 2006, Vitória competed in the Campeonato Brasileiro Série C, but was eliminated in the competition's first stage.

Titles

Football
 Campeonato Capixaba: 1932, 1933, 1943, 1950, 1952, 1956, 1976, 2006, 2019
 Campeonato da Cidade de Vitória: 1920
 Copa Espírito Santo: 2009, 2010, 2018
 Campeonato Capixaba Second Level: 2009, 2016
 President's Cup (Korea) : 1979

Basketball
Campeonato Capixaba de Basquete: 1935, 1936, 1937, 1938, 1939, 1940, 1941, 1942, 1943, 1944, and 1945

Current squad (selected)

Stadium
Vitória's home stadium is Salvador Venâncio da Costa stadium, inaugurated in 1967, with a maximum capacity of 10,000 people. The stadium is also known as Estádio Ninho das Águias, meaning Eagles Nest Stadium.

Club colors
Vitória's colors are blue and white. The club's home kit is composed of blue shirts, white shorts and blue socks.

Mascot
The club's mascot is called Águia Azul, meaning Blue Eagle. As the name implies, the mascot is a blue-colored eagle.

Anthem
The club's anthem was composed by Carlos Bona in 1993.

Nickname
Vitória is nicknamed Alvianil, meaning Blue-White.

Ultra groups
There are several ultra groups supporting the club:

Torcida Organizada Águia Azul, founded in 1972;
Torcida Organizada Peroá Azul, founded in 2001;
Torcida Organizada Trovão Azul, founded in 1992.

Other sports
For several years, Vitória had an active basketball team. The club also owns a swimming academy.

Miscellaneous
Vitória is the oldest Espírito Santo club.
During World War II, due to the Brazilian government's Campanha do Metal (Metal Campaign), the club donated all its trophies to be used for cannon production.

References

External links
 Vitoriablog.com (ex-Vitoriafc.net) – Vitória's First Website
 Vitória's Official Website
 Vitória at RSSSF
 Vitória at Arquivo de Clubes

 
Association football clubs established in 1912
1912 establishments in Brazil
Football clubs in Espírito Santo